This is a list of seas of the World Ocean, including marginal seas, areas of water, various gulfs, bights, bays, and straits.

Terminology
 Ocean – the four to seven largest named bodies of water in the World Ocean, all of which have "Ocean" in the name.  See Borders of the oceans for details.  
 Sea has several definitions: 
 A marginal sea is a division of an ocean, partially enclosed by islands, archipelagos, or peninsulas, adjacent to or widely open to the open ocean at the surface, and/or bounded by submarine ridges on the sea floor.
 A division of an ocean, delineated by landforms,  currents (e.g., Sargasso Sea), or specific latitude or longitude boundaries.  This includes but is not limited to marginal seas, and this is the definition used for inclusion in this list.
 The World Ocean. For example, the Law of the Sea states that all of the World Ocean is "sea", and this is also common usage for "the sea".
 Any large body of water with "Sea" in the name, including lakes.
 River – a narrow strip of water that flows over land from a higher elevation to a lower one
 Tributary – a small river that flows into a larger one
 Estuary – the piece of a river that flows into the sea or ocean
 Strait – a narrow area of water connecting two wider areas of water, also sometimes known as a passage
 Channel – usually wider than a strait
 Passage – connects waters between islands, also sometimes known as a strait
 Canal – a man-made channel
 Fjard – a large open water between groups of islands

There are several terms used for bulges of ocean that result from indentations of land, which overlap in definition, and which are not consistently differentiated:

 Bay – generic term; though most features with "Bay" in the name are small, some are very large
 Gulf – a very large bay, often a top-level division of an ocean or sea
 Fjord – a long bay with steep sides, typically formed by a glacier
 Bight – a bay that is typically shallower than a sound
 Sound – a large, wide bay which is typically deeper than a bight, or a strait
 Cove – a small, typically sheltered bay with a relatively narrow entrance
 Inlet – a narrow and long bay similar to a land peninsula, but adjoining the sea
 Polynya – least used of these terms, a patch of water surrounded by ice

Many features could be considered to be more than one of these, and all of these terms are used in place names inconsistently; especially bays, gulfs, and bights, which can be very large or very small. This list includes large areas of water no matter the term used in the name.

Largest seas by area
The largest terrestrial seas are:

 Philippine Sea – 5.695 million km2
 Coral Sea – 4.791 million km2
 American Mediterranean Sea – 4.200 million km2
 Arabian Sea – 3.862 million km2
 Sargasso Sea – 3.5 million km2
 South China Sea – 3.5 million km2
 Weddell Sea – 2.8 million km2
 Caribbean Sea – 2.754 million km2
 Mediterranean Sea – 2.510 million km2
 Gulf of Guinea – 2.35 million km2
 Tasman Sea – 2.3 million km2
 Bay of Bengal – 2.172 million km2
 Bering Sea – 2 million km2
 Sea of Okhotsk – 1.583 million km2
 Gulf of Mexico – 1.550 million km2
 Gulf of Alaska – 1.533 million km2
 Barents Sea – 1.4 million km2
 Norwegian Sea – 1.383 million km2
 East China Sea – 1.249 million km2
 Hudson Bay – 1.23 million km2
 Greenland Sea – 1.205 million km2
 Somov Sea – 1.15 million km2
 Mar de Grau – 1.14 million km2
 Riiser-Larsen Sea – 1.138 million km2 
 Sea of Japan – 1.05 million km2
 Argentine Sea – 1 million km2
 East Siberian Sea – 987,000 km2
 Lazarev Sea – 929,000 km2
 Kara Sea – 926,000 km2
 Scotia Sea – 900,000 km2
 Labrador Sea – 841,000 km2
 Andaman Sea – 797,700 km2
 Laccadive Sea – 786,000 km2
 Irminger Sea – 780,000 km2
 Solomon Sea – 720,000 km2
 Mozambique Channel – 700,000 km2
 Cosmonauts Sea – 699,000 km2
 Banda Sea – 695,000 km2
 Baffin Bay – 689,000 km2
 Laptev Sea – 662,000 km2
 Arafura Sea – 650,000 km2
 Ross Sea – 637,000 km2
 Chukchi Sea – 620,000 km2
 Timor Sea – 610,000 km2
 North Sea – 575,000 km2
 Bellingshausen Sea – 487,000 km2
 Beaufort Sea – 476,000 km2
 Red Sea – 438,000 km2
 Black Sea – 436,000 km2
 Gulf of Aden – 410,000 km2
 Yellow Sea – 380,000 km2
 Baltic Sea – 377,000 km2
 Caspian Sea – 371,000 km2
 Libyan Sea – 350,000 km2
 Mawson Sea – 333,000 km2
 Levantine Sea – 320,000 km2
 Java Sea – 320,000 km2
 Gulf of Thailand – 320,000 km2
 Celtic Sea – 300,000 km2
 Gulf of Carpentaria – 300,000 km2
 Celebes Sea – 280,000 km2
 Tyrrhenian Sea – 275,000 km2
 Sulu Sea – 260,000 km2
 Cooperation Sea – 258,000 km2
 Persian Gulf – 251,000 km2
 Flores Sea – 240,000 km2
 Gulf of Saint Lawrence – 226,000 km2
 Bay of Biscay – 223,000 km2
 Aegean Sea – 214,000 km2
 Gulf of Anadyr – 200,000 km2
 Molucca Sea – 200,000 km2
 Oman Sea – 181,000 km2
 Ionian Sea – 169,000 km2
 Gulf of California – 160,000 km2
 Balearic Sea – 150,000 km2
 Adriatic Sea – 138,000 km2

Marginal seas by ocean 
Seas may be considered marginal between ocean and land, or between oceans in which case they may be treated as marginal parts of either. There is no single ultimate authority on the matter.

Arctic Ocean 
(clockwise from 180°)
 Chukchi Sea
 East Siberian Sea
 Laptev Sea
 Kara Sea
 Barents Sea (connected to the Kara Sea by the Kara Strait)
 Pechora Sea
 White Sea
 Queen Victoria Sea
 Wandel Sea
 Greenland Sea
 Lincoln Sea (recognized by the IHO but not the IMO)
 Baffin Bay
 The Northwest Passages
 Prince Gustav Adolf Sea
 Amundsen Gulf
 (more to be listed) 
 Hudson Bay
 Foxe Basin
 Bowman Bay
 Wager Bay
 Roes Welcome Sound
 Foxe Channel
 Bay of Gods Mercy
 Hudson Strait
 Ungava Bay
 Native Bay
 Evans Strait
 Fisher Strait
 James Bay
 Beaufort Sea

Atlantic Ocean
In addition to the marginal seas listed in the three sub-sections below, the Arctic Ocean itself is sometimes also considered a marginal sea of the Atlantic.

Africa and Eurasia

 Norwegian Sea
 North Sea
 Kattegat
 Skagerrak
 Wadden Sea
 Dogger Bank
 Baltic Sea
 Gulf of Bothnia
 Kvarken
 Bothnian Sea
 South Kvarken
 Sea of Åland
 Archipelago Sea
 Gulf of Finland
 Vyborg Bay
 Neva Bay
 Koporye Bay
 Luga Bay
 Narva Bay
 Väinameri Sea
 Gulf of Riga
 Curonian Lagoon
 Vistula Lagoon
 Gdańsk Bay
 Bay of Pomerania
 Szczecin Lagoon
 Bay of Greifswald
 Rügischer Bodden
 Strelasund
 Bay of Lübeck
 Bay of Kiel
 Kalmar Strait
 Bight of Hanö
 Danish straits
 Oresund Strait
 Fehmarn Belt
 Great Belt
 Little Belt
 English Channel
 Strait of Dover
 Irish Sea
 Celtic Sea
 Iroise Sea
 Bay of Biscay
 Cantabrian Sea
 Gulf of Cádiz
 Mediterranean Sea 
 Alboran Sea
 Mar Menor
 Balearic (Catalan) Sea
 Gulf of Valencia
 Gulf of Lion
 Étang de Thau
 Ligurian Sea
 Gulf of Genoa
 Tyrrhenian Sea 
 Gulf of Naples
 Gulf of Salerno
 Gulf of Cagliari
 Adriatic Sea 
 Bay of Kotor
 Gulf of Venice
 Gulf of Trieste
 Venetian Lagoon
 Kvarner Gulf
 Ionian Sea 
 Gulf of Taranto
 Gulf of Corinth
 Messenian Gulf
 Laconian Gulf
 Aegean Sea 
 Myrtoan Sea
 Argolic Gulf
 Saronic Gulf
 Petalioi Gulf
 South Euboean Gulf
 North Euboean Gulf
 Malian Gulf
 Pagasetic Gulf
 Thermaic Gulf
 Thracian Sea
 Strymonian Gulf
 Gulf of Saros
 Edremit Gulf
 Gulf of İzmir
 Icarian Sea
 Gulf of Gökova
 Sea of Crete
 Sea of Marmara
 Gulf of İzmit
 Levantine Sea
 Gulf of Antalya
 Gulf of Alexandretta
 Libyan Sea
 Gulf of Sidra
 Gulf of Gabès
 Strait of Sicily
 Gulf of Tunis
 Inland Sea, Gozo
 Sea of Sardinia
 Gulf of Asinara
 Black Sea
 Gulf of Burgas
 Karkinit Bay
 Kalamita Bay
 Sea of Azov
 Syvash
 Taganrog Bay
 Bay of Arguin
 Dakhlet Nouadhibou
 Yawri Bay
 Gulf of Guinea
 Bight of Benin
 Bight of Bonny
 Corisco Bay
 Luanda Bay
 Walvis Bay
 Saldanha Bay
 Table Bay
 False Bay

Americas
(coast-wise from north to south)

 North Water Polynya
 Baffin Bay
 Davis Strait
 Home Bay
 Labrador Sea
 Cumberland Sound
 Frobisher Bay
 Gulf of St. Lawrence
 Gulf of Maine
 Bay of Fundy
 Massachusetts Bay
 Cape Cod Bay
 Nantucket Sound
 Vineyard Sound
 Buzzards Bay
 Narragansett Bay
 Rhode Island Sound
 Block Island Sound
 Fishers Island Sound
 Long Island Sound
 Shelter Island Sound
 Noyack Bay
 Peconic Bay
 Gardiners Bay
 Tobaccolot Bay
 Sag Harbor Bay
 Three Mile Harbor
 Long Beach Bay
 Pipes Cove
 Southold Bay
 Flanders Bay
 Napeague Bay
 Fort Pond Bay
 North Sea Harbor
 New York Bay
 Upper New York Bay
 Lower New York Bay
 Jamaica Bay
 Raritan Bay
 Sandy Hook Bay
 Delaware Bay
 Chesapeake Bay
 Albemarle Sound
 Pamlico Sound
 American Mediterranean Sea
 Gulf of Mexico
 Florida Bay
 Tampa Bay
 Charlotte Harbor Estuary
 Pensacola Bay
 Mobile Bay
 Vermilion Bay
 Galveston Bay
 Bay of Campeche
 Caribbean Sea
 Gulf of Gonâve (Haiti)
 Gulf of Honduras
 Golfo de los Mosquitos
 Gulf of Venezuela
Lake Maracaibo
 Gulf of Paria
 Gulf of Darién
 Bay of All Saints
 Guanabara Bay
 Lagoa dos Patos
 Argentine Sea
 Samborombón Bay
 San Matías Gulf
 Golfo Nuevo
 San Jorge Gulf

Northern islands

(from east to west)

 Irish Sea (between Great Britain and Ireland)
 Inner Seas off the West Coast of Scotland
 Sea of the Hebrides (Great Britain)
 Denmark Strait (between Greenland and Iceland)
 Irminger Sea

Indian Ocean

 Andaman Sea
 Gulf of Martaban – an arm of the Andaman Sea in the southern part of Myanmar
 Arabian Sea
 Gulf of Kutch
 Gulf of Khambhat
 Bay of Bengal
 Gulf of Aden
 Gulf of Oman
 Laccadive Sea
 Mozambique Channel
 Persian Gulf
 Red Sea
 Sea of Zanj
 Timor Sea
 Palk Strait
 Palk Bay
 Gulf of Mannar

Pacific Ocean

Americas 
 Bering Sea
 Bristol Bay
 Norton Sound
 Chilean Sea
 Gulf of Corcovado
 Gulf of Penas
 Moraleda Channel
 Reloncaví Sound
 Sea of Chiloé
 Gulf of Alaska
 Cook Inlet
 Glacier Bay
 Prince William Sound
 Salish Sea
 Gulf of California (also known as the Sea of Cortés)
 Gulf of the Farallones
 Gulf of Fonseca
 Gulf of Guayaquil
 Gulf of Nicoya
 Gulf of Panama
 Bay of San Miguel
 Gulf of Parita
 Panama Bay
 Grau Sea
 San Francisco Bay
 San Pablo Bay

Australia and Eurasia 
 Arafura Sea
 Bali Sea
 Banda Sea
 Bay of Kampong Som
 Bay of Plenty
 Bismarck Sea
 Bohai Sea
 Bohol Sea (also known as the Mindanao Sea)
 Camotes Sea
 Celebes Sea
 Ceram Sea
 Coral Sea
 Devil's/Dragon's Sea
 East China Sea
 Ariake Sea
 Hangzhou Bay
 Kagoshima Bay
 Flores Sea
 Gulf of Carpentaria
 Gulf of Thailand
 Bandon Bay
 Bay of Bangkok
 Halmahera Sea
 Hauraki Gulf
 Hawke's Bay
 Java Sea
 Koro Sea
 Molucca Sea
 Philippine Sea
 Ise Bay
 Mikawa Bay
 Suruga Bay
 Poverty Bay
 Sagami Bay
 Savu Sea
 Sea of Japan
 Peter the Great Gulf
 Toyama Bay
 Wakasa Bay
 Sea of Okhotsk
 Shelikhov Gulf
 Seto Inland Sea
 Osaka Bay
 Sibuyan Sea
 Solomon Sea
 South China Sea 
 Gulf of Tonkin
 Qiongzhou Strait
 Natuna Sea
 North Natuna Sea
 West Philippine Sea
 South Seas
 Gulf of Tonkin
 Sulu Sea
 Tasman Sea
 Tokyo Bay
 Visayan Sea
 Waihau Bay
 Yellow Sea
 Bohai Sea
 Bohai Bay
 Laizhou Bay
 Liaodong Bay
 Jiaozhou Bay
 Korea Sea

Southern Ocean
 Amundsen Sea
 Bellingshausen Sea
 Cooperation Sea
 Cosmonauts Sea
 Davis Sea
 D'Urville Sea
 Drake Passage
 King Haakon VII Sea
 Lazarev Sea
 Mawson Sea
 McMurdo Sound
 Polynyas in McMurdo Sound
 Riiser-Larsen Sea
 Ross Sea
 Scotia Sea
 Somov Sea
 Spencer Gulf
 Weddell Sea
 Weddell Polynya/Maud Rise Polynya

Defined by currents
 Sargasso Sea – North Atlantic Gyre

Not included
Entities called "seas" which are not divisions of the World Ocean are not included in this list. Excluded are:

 Salt lakes with "Sea" in the name: Aral Sea, Dead Sea, Salton Sea
 Freshwater lakes with "Sea" in the name: Sea of Galilee
 Extraterrestrial oceans: list of largest lakes and seas in the Solar System
 Gulfs, bays, straits, and other bodies of water in lakes

Other items not included:

 Coral reefs
 Glaciers
 Ice shelves
 Marshes
 Ocean banks
 Ocean gyres
 Oceans
 Reefs
 River deltas
 Rivers
 Swamps
 Swimming pools / water parks
 Wetlands

See also

 Inland sea (geology)
 Mediterranean sea (oceanography)
 Oceanography
 Atlantic Ocean
 Indian Ocean
 List of largest lakes and seas in the Solar System

Notes

References

External links

 
Seas
 
Geographic taxonomies
Oceanography